IJsselhallen is a convention center located in Zwolle, Netherlands, which has hosted many concerts.
It hosted Legoland 2010. IJsselhallen has a floor space of 20,000 m2 and was built in 1972. The IJsselhallen proposed to host the Eurovision Song Contest 2020 but pulled out because it is too small, the roof is too low and the capacity would not reach the EBU’s requirement.

References

External links
 Website IJsselhallen

Buildings and structures in Zwolle
Convention centres in the Netherlands